The Julia Butler Hansen Bridge in Wahkiakum County, in the U.S. state of Washington, connects Cathlamet to Puget Island. It spans the Cathlamet Channel of the Columbia River. The Wahkiakum County Ferry connects Puget Island to Westport, Oregon.  The bridge was named after former United States Congresswoman Julia Butler Hansen, who represented Washington from 1960 to 1974.

References
Wahkiakum County's Julia Butler Hansen Bridge is completed in August 1939. HistoryLink.org Essay 8025
Craig Holstine and Richard Hobbs, Spanning Washington: Historic Highway Bridges of the Evergreen State (Pullman, Washington: WSU Press, 2005), 100–101. 
Structurae [en]: Julia Butler Hansen Bridge (1939)

Transportation buildings and structures in Wahkiakum County, Washington
Bridges over the Columbia River
Road bridges in Washington (state)
Bridges completed in 1939
1939 establishments in Washington (state)
Concrete bridges in the United States
Cantilever bridges in the United States